Ioannis Fountoulis (also Giannis, ; born 25 May 1988) is a Greek water polo player. He is currently the captain of Greece men's national water polo team, with whom he won a bronze medal at the 2015 World Championships, a bronze medal at the 2016 World League , 2020 World League and competed at the 2012 and 2016 Olympics. He played for the Greek powerhouse Olympiacos since 2009, and in 2018 he won the 2017–18 LEN Champions League with the Greek giants, scoring 4 goals in the final game against Pro Recco in Genoa. Is a very big scorer and leader is considered one of the top players in the world and it is typical how in 2016 and 2018 he was voted as the second top player in the world. Currently playing for the Greek club  Olympiacos.

Fountoulis was the top scorer of the 2017 World Championship with 23 goals and the top scorer of the 2018 European Championship with 17 goals (along with Aleksandar Ivović). He was voted in the All-Tournament Team of the 2015 World Championship as well as the All-Tournament Team of the 2017 World Championship. Fountoulis has been the top scorer of Greek Water Polo League six times (2012–2017, consecutive) playing for Olympiacos. He has been voted MVP of the Greek Water Polo League τhree times in 2012–13, 2014–15 and 2016–17 seasons and three times Greek Cup MVP in 2011, 2013 and 2018.

As of June 2018, Fountoulis has scored 148 goals in LEN Champions League, the most by any Greek player in the history of the top-tier European competition.

Fountoulis was given the honour to carry the national flag of Greece at the closing ceremony of the 2020 Summer Olympics in Tokyo, becoming the 28th water polo player to be a flag bearer at the opening and closing ceremonies of the Olympics.

Honours

Club
Olympiacos
 LEN Champions League: 2017–18 ; runners-up: 2015–16, 2018–19
 Greek Championship: 2009–10, 2010–11, 2012–13, 2013–14, 2014–15, 2015–16, 2016–17, 2017–18, 2018–19, 2021–22
 Greek Cup: 2009–10, 2010–11, 2012–13, 2013–14, 2014–15, 2015–16, 2017–18, 2018–19, 2021–22, 2022–23
 Greek Super Cup: 2018
Ferencváros
LEN Champions League runners-up: 2020–21
LEN Super Cup: 2019
Hungarian Cup: 2019–20, 2020–21

National team
  Silver Medal in 2020 Olympic  Games, Tokyo
  Silver Medal in 2018 Mediterranean Games Tarragona
  Bronze Medal in 2013 Mediterranean Games, Mersin
  Bronze Medal in 2015 World Championship Kazan
  Bronze Medal in 2006 World League Athens
  Bronze Medal in 2016 World League Huizhou
  Bronze Medal in 2020 World League Tbilisi
 4th place in 2016 European Championship 
 Belgrade
 4th place in 2017 World Championship 
 Budapest
 6th place in 2016 Olympic Games, Rio

Awards
 Top Scorer of the 2017 World Championship: 23 goals
 Top Scorer of the 2018 European Championship: 17 goals
 2015 World Championship Team of the Tournament
 2017 World Championship Team of the Tournament
 Greek Championship Top scorer:  2011–12, 2012–13, 2013–14, 2014–15, 2015–16, 2016–17  with Olympiacos
 All-time Greek Top Scorer in the LEN Champions League: 148 goals with Olympiacos
 Greek Championship MVP: 2012–13, 2014–15, 2016–17 with Olympiacos
 Greek Cup MVP: 2011, 2013, 2018 with Olympiacos
Greek Water Polo Player of the Year: 2021
Second Top European Player  in the World by LEN: 2016 
Third Top European Player in the World by LEN: 2018, 2021
Member of the World Team  2018 by total-waterpolo

See also
 Greece men's Olympic water polo team records and statistics
 List of flag bearers for Greece at the Olympics
 List of World Aquatics Championships medalists in water polo

References

External links

 

Greek male water polo players
1988 births
Living people
Olympiacos Water Polo Club players
Olympic water polo players of Greece
Water polo players at the 2012 Summer Olympics
World Aquatics Championships medalists in water polo
Water polo players at the 2016 Summer Olympics
Mediterranean Games medalists in water polo
Mediterranean Games silver medalists for Greece
Mediterranean Games bronze medalists for Greece
Competitors at the 2013 Mediterranean Games
Competitors at the 2018 Mediterranean Games
Water polo players at the 2020 Summer Olympics
Medalists at the 2020 Summer Olympics
Olympic silver medalists for Greece
Olympic medalists in water polo
Sportspeople from Chios